Ranérou is a small town with commune status in north-east Senegal. It is the chief settlement of  Ranérou-Ferlo Department in Matam Region and is connected to Dakar and Touba to the west and Ouro Sogui and Mauretania to the east by the N3 road.

In 2013 its population was recorded at just over 3,000.

References

Populated places in Matam Region
Communes of Senegal